Fade to Grey: The Singles Collection is a 1983 compilation album by the British synthpop group Visage.

Background
Released as a stop-gap between studio albums whilst the band was experiencing contractual difficulties, the compilation includes all of the Visage singles released up to that point (five of them UK Top 30 hits), the majority taken from their first two albums Visage (1980) and The Anvil (1982), as well as a couple of non-single tracks. The cassette version was released as a Special Dance Mix Cassette, featuring remixes as well as a bonus track, "Der Amboss" (a German-language version of the song "The Anvil"). In British HMV stores, a limited number of copies of the album and cassette were issued with a free 7" vinyl picture disc of the "Pleasure Boys" single from 1982. The album reached No. 38 on the UK Albums Chart and was certified Gold by the British Phonographic Industry, based on pre-release sales to shops.

The album was re-released a decade later as Fade to Grey – The Best of Visage with a similar cover and tracklisting but with the inclusion of two tracks not featured on the original release: "Love Glove" (Visage's penultimate single), from the album Beat Boy (1984), and the Bassheads/Andy Stevenson remix of "Fade to Grey", which became a minor Top 40 hit again in 1993. The only single not included on this compilation was "Beat Boy", the band's final single from 1984.

In October 2020, the Special Dance Mix version of the album was released for the first time on CD by Rubellan Remasters. The CD features all of the tracks originally included on the original 1983 cassette version (many of them still in their non-stop "hit mix" form) along with several bonus tracks.

Track listing

Standard version

Special Dance Mix versions
1983 Special Dance Mix Cassette
Side one:
"Fade to Grey" (12" Dance Mix) – 6:20
"Mind of a Toy" (12" Dance Mix) – 5:10
"Visage" (12" Dance Mix) – 5:31
"We Move" (remix) – 3:32
"Tar" – 3.30
"Der Amboss" (edit) - 4:34
Side two:
"In the Year 2525" – 3:42
"The Anvil" (special remix for this album) – 5:01
"Night Train" (special remix for this album) – 6:20
"Pleasure Boys" – 3:33
"Damned Don't Cry" (12" Dance Mix) – 5:40
(Timings are approximate, as the cassette release was produced as a non-stop "hit mix" in which some tracks fade into each other.)

2020 Rubellan Remasters Special Dance Mix CD
"Fade to Grey" – 6:22
"Mind of a Toy" – 5:11
"Visage" – 5:33
"We Move" (Remix) – 3:34
"Tar" – 3:28
"In the Year 2525" – 3:40
"The Anvil" – 4:57
"Night Train" – 6:24
"Pleasure Boys" – 3:27
"The Damned Don't Cry" – 5:37
"Frequency 7" – 3:05
"Night Train" (7" Remix) – 3:42
"Der Amboss" – 4:37
"Pleasure Boys" (Bonus Beats) – 5:50
"Night Train" (Dub Mix) – 5:03

Charts

Certifications

References

1983 compilation albums
1993 compilation albums
Albums produced by Midge Ure
Polydor Records compilation albums
Visage (band) albums